Makhani pyaz (butter mixed onion) is a popular summertime dish for the Saraiki people of Punjab, Pakistan. An onion is wrapped with butter in hot Tandoori roti until soft, then served unaccompanied.

References

Pakistani cuisine